Elgin Township may refer to the following townships in the United States:

 Elgin Township, Kane County, Illinois
 Elgin Township, Wabasha County, Minnesota
 Elgin Township, Antelope County, Nebraska

Township name disambiguation pages